Lucifer Morningstar (also known as Samael before his banishment from heaven) is a fictional character and titular protagonist of the urban fantasy comedy-drama television series Lucifer. The character is portrayed by Welsh actor Tom Ellis and is based on the protagonist of The Sandman comic book series along with his own spin-off series, created by Neil Gaiman, both published by DC Comics' Vertigo publications. The character is based on the Devil from Christianity who has arisen to Los Angeles for a vacation from Hell with his ex-lover and companion, the demoness Mazikeen, to run a nightclub. 

The character was adapted for television by Joe Henderson as the showrunner for a series based on the Sandman character Lucifer, with Ellis tapped to play the titular role in February 2015. Ellis' performance has been particularly praised by critics and the character has become a fan-favorite among many.

Role in series

Samael is a  fallen archangel who, after leading an unsuccessful rebellion against Heaven, was banished by God to serve as Lord of Hell. After his fall, he changed his name to Lucifer. Lucifer is shown to hold a deep resentment towards his father for that, as well as his mother for doing nothing. In 2011, Lucifer became bored with his life, so he abdicated his throne and moved to Los Angeles to run his own high-end nightclub called "Lux" for the next five years; during which time he was assisted by John Constantine in retrieving Mazikeen from Hell so she could continue serving as his bodyguard. Lucifer would later repay this debt by helping Constantine and his allies recover Oliver Queen's soul from Purgatory. After five years, Lucifer became a civilian consultant for the Los Angeles Police Department in the pilot episode, while still running his nightclub.

Lucifer is very open about his identity as the Devil, always telling people who he is. However, very few take this seriously unless he lets them see his "Devil Face" – i.e., his true demonic appearance – which he usually does to frighten evildoers.  Lucifer is highly sexual, bisexual, and is irresistible to most people.

As a fallen angel, Lucifer possesses several supernatural traits and abilities. He has superhuman strength, enough to throw a grown man several yards or hold an accelerating car still (if he is adequately braced). Lucifer is immortal and his human body is highly durable; he can withstand gunfire  or walk through a burning building without harm. He can, however, be injured by Mazikeen's mystical karambits which all celestial beings are vulnerable to. Lucifer originally had a pair of angelic wings, which he had severed by Maze when he arrived in Los Angeles. These wings grew back at the end of season two. The wings are as durable as Lucifer's body; they can resist gunfire and, when flapped, can generate a wind strong enough to knock down a human. Lucifer also possesses the supernatural ability to make people tell him their hidden desires by simply making eye contact and asking them. It is neither hypnosis nor telepathy, and is dependent upon whether the person it is being used upon is a simple or complex person (the more complex or complicated a person is, the more they can resist, and the more time and effort is needed to overcome their resistance), and only Chloe Decker has been shown to be immune to the effect.

Lucifer's principal weakness is that he becomes vulnerable to harm whenever Chloe Decker is close to him or in the immediate vicinity. If he is mortally injured when Chloe is nearby, he can die just like any other human. This effect even renders Lucifer susceptible to minor cuts or painfully stubbing his toe. Once Chloe is far enough away from him, Lucifer's body regains its durability. However, in the pilot episode, he was still invulnerable near Chloe, not manifesting until after a moment of emotional vulnerability, where Chloe sees the scars on Lucifer's back, where his wings were. Chloe's presence does not deprive Lucifer of any of his other supernatural traits, such as his strength.  This suggests that Lucifer's physical vulnerability is a manifestation of his emotional vulnerability towards Chloe.

Storylines

Season 1

Lucifer is shown to have a complicated relationship with his family. During season 1, his brother Amenadiel tries to force him to return to his hell duties, but he steadfastly refuses to comply with his father's wishes. When the container holding his wings was stolen in the episode "Favorite Son", Lucifer recovers them only to set them on fire as a sign of his rebellion against God's wishes. However, in the season finale, Lucifer prays to God to save Chloe's life after he is shot, willing to do anything in exchange. God gives him a vision: Lucifer's mother has escaped Hell and it is his duty to bring her back.

Season 2

Season 2 shows his complicated relationship with his mother. While he initially intends to help her return to Heaven (so she and his father will destroy each other), he finally decides to send her to another universe, where she could create her own world free from God's influence. Also, in season 2's finale, his wings were restored. 

On Earth, Lucifer creates a connection with Detective Chloe Decker, who's immune to his abilities. After Chloe kisses him in the season 2 episode "Stewardess Interruptus", he discovers she is the result of a miracle done by Amenadiel on God's orders and pushes her away for her own good.

Season 3

In season 3, he has to deal with the new precinct lieutenant, Marcus Pierce. When he discovers Pierce is Cain the first murderer, he agrees to help him find a way to die to annoy his father, but backs off after Chloe is in danger. He also struggles with his feelings for her when she starts dating Pierce, and his inability to express them. He also loses his "Devil Face" at the beginning of the season. In the penultimate episode, "Quintessential Deckerstar", Lucifer and Chloe kiss again after he confesses his feelings for her. However, this happens just before he kills Cain and recovers his true "Devil Face", which Chloe finally sees in the season finale.

Season 4

In season 4, Lucifer has to deal with the aftermath of Chloe finally learning the truth (resulting in her hesitantly conspiring with a priest named Father Kinley to send Lucifer back to Hell) and the return of Eve, a former lover of his. Meanwhile, Amenadiel learns that Linda is pregnant with their half angel son. Due to Chloe's betrayal, Lucifer resumes his relationship with Eve, who claims to be in love with him and accepts him for who he is. As the season progresses, Lucifer's growing hatred of himself cause his angel wings to become demon wings and he gains a more demonic alternate form. At the same time, Father Kinley reveals to Chloe a prophecy that Lucifer and his first love will unleash evil upon the Earth. Meanwhile, with Eve at his side urging him on, Lucifer goes back to his old habits, going as far as brutally crippling a criminal as punishment. But he later realizes he doesn't like who he is around Eve and breaks up with her.

In the season finale, after Eve kills Kinley and summons the demon Dromos into his body, Lucifer has to rescue his nephew Charlie, Linda and Amenadiel's newborn son, scaring the demons into returning to Hell using his full demonic form before Chloe. Chloe finally accepts Lucifer completely, even after seeing his demonic form and admits her love for him. However, Lucifer decides that he must return to Hell to keep the demons in line, recognizing that Chloe was his true love, even if Eve was his first. After a tearful goodbye and last kiss with Chloe, Lucifer uses his wings, angelic white once again, to return to his throne in Hell.

Season 5

In season 5, Lucifer returns from Hell to confront his twin brother Michael, who attempts to steal his identity, leaving Amenadiel in his place. Later he learns from Amenadiel that God relieved him from his duties as the guardian of Hell and moves forward with his relationship with Chloe.

After his father retired, he began competing with his brother Michael for the title of God.  He fought his brother to the death, but the fight was stopped after Michael killed Chloe.  Despite the fact that Lucifer would burn if he flew to heaven, he went there to resurrect Chloe.  Once there, he helped her get back to earth, and died himself.  However, he was resurrected and returned to earth, stopping Chloe from killing Michael.  He finished the duel with his brother, but did not kill him, only cut off his wings, saying that everyone deserves a second chance.  After this he was recognized and accepted as God, by demons and other angels, including Michael.

Creation and conception
Neil Gaiman's Lucifer was partly inspired by David Bowie, but the show's creators decided against trying to mimic Bowie. Tom Ellis saw the character as a sort of Oscar Wilde or Noël Coward character "with added rock and roll spirit", approaching his portrayal as if he were the "lovechild of Noël Coward and Mick Jagger, with a dash of British actor Terry-Thomas".

Reception
Ellis received praise for his performance as Lucifer Morningstar. Bleeding Cools Dan Wickline offered praise to Ellis' sarcastic, wittingly charming take on the Devil, stating, "the show itself is enjoyable because of the great dialogue and flawless delivery from its lead" and "This version of Lucifer refuses to take almost anything seriously and the show is better for it." Max Nicholson of IGN rated the pilot episode a 6.9/10, praising Tom Ellis's performance as Lucifer and the lighthearted tone of the series, but criticizing the series for essentially being another crime procedural series.

References

Lucifer (TV series)
Television characters introduced in 2016
Male characters in television
DC Comics characters who are shapeshifters
DC Comics characters who can move at superhuman speeds
DC Comics characters who have mental powers
DC Comics characters who use magic
DC Comics characters with accelerated healing
DC Comics characters with superhuman strength
DC Comics angels
DC Comics demons
DC Comics LGBT characters
DC Comics television characters
DC Comics telekinetics
Fictional bisexual males
Fictional castaways
Fictional characters with death or rebirth abilities
Fictional characters with healing abilities
Fictional characters with immortality
Fictional torturers
Fictional socialites
Fictional musicians
Fictional LGBT characters in television
The Flash (2014 TV series) characters